The White Horse Whisky Challenge was a women's professional golf tournament on the Ladies European Tour held in England. It was played at Selsdon Park in Croydon, south London in 1983, and at Burnham Beeches near Slough in Buckinghamshire in 1984.

Winners

Source:

References

External links
Ladies European Tour

Former Ladies European Tour events
Golf tournaments in England
Defunct sports competitions in England
Recurring sporting events established in 1983
Recurring sporting events disestablished in 1984